Maren Lundby (born 7 September 1994) is a Norwegian ski jumper. She is one of the sport's most successful athletes, male or female, having won three consecutive World Cup overall titles (an all-time female record), thirty individual World Cup wins, and gold medals at the 2018 Winter Olympics and the 2019 and 2021 World Championships. 

Lundby is also known as an advocate for gender equality in the sport. Because of her efforts, women are now allowed to jump on the large hill during the World Championships.

Ski jumping career
Lundby represents the Kolbu KK ski club. She made her debut in the Continental Cup, the highest level in women's ski jumping at the time, on 12 August 2007 with a 56th place in Bischofsgruen. At age 14, she made history as the first female ski jumper in a World Championship, when she jumped with bib number 1 at the FIS Nordic World Ski Championships 2009 in Liberec. On 6 September 2010, she made the first jump when the new Midtstubakken in Oslo was opened. She landed on 87 meters. 14 March 2019, Lundby won the first women's edition of Raw Air. 12 March 2020, Lundby won the second edition of Raw Air and also became the first woman to win the World Cup three years in a row. She is the first ski jumper to do so since Adam Małysz in 2001–2003.
On 3 March 2021, Lundby became the first female world champion on the large hill.

In October 2021, Lundby withdrew from the 2022 Winter Olympics and said she had difficulties losing weight and did not feel she could perform at the top level.

She was awarded the Holmenkollen Medal in 2021.

Major tournament results

Olympics

FIS World Nordic Ski Championships

World Cup

Standings

Individual wins

References

External links

 
 

1994 births
Living people
Sportspeople from Gjøvik
Norwegian female ski jumpers
Olympic ski jumpers of Norway
Ski jumpers at the 2014 Winter Olympics
Ski jumpers at the 2018 Winter Olympics
FIS Nordic World Ski Championships medalists in ski jumping
Medalists at the 2018 Winter Olympics
Olympic gold medalists for Norway
Olympic medalists in ski jumping